Halla Ayla (born in 1957) is an Iraqi American artist and self-taught photographer, currently living in San Francisco, CA. She is noted for her activism and is a champion of women's rights and also works to encourage peace and understanding between the Arab world and the West. These causes are reflected in her artwork.

Early life and career
Ayla was born Baghdad, Iraq and grew up in Baghdad and in Beirut, Lebanon. Ayla divided her time between Iraq, Lebanon and Saudi Arabia, after which she lived in Europe for 15 years before travelling to the United States in 1991 and finally settling in San Francisco.

She achieved BA Business from Sorbonne University in Paris, as well as MA (Marketing & Business) from the American College in London and Webster University, Geneva. She also undertook art courses at the College of Marin in California.

With more than 30 years experience as a photographer, she began painting in her early thirties and now combines photography with painting and collage to create unique mixed media painted photographs from her journeys to the Middle East. She makes extensive use of transfers which she uses to build up multi-layered images with texture and complexity.

She is an activist; a champion of women's rights and also works to encourage peace and understanding between the Arab world and the West. These causes are reflected in her artwork and her public appearances. She gave a keynote address at a Red Cross Annual Meeting where she spoke about the historic legacy of the Arabs and its impact on today's world. Ayla has also appeared on national and local radio and television such as ABC's "Good Morning America" as a champion for Arab art culture and humanity.

Work 
A distinctive feature of Ayla's artwork is the use of Arab motifs such as calligraphy and the geometric patterns of Arabesque. Much of her work is produced in series, with each series dedicated to a specific geographic region. Her first series was entitled The Arab World Unveiled; the second was The Mysteries of Egypt, and the third, which focused on the Levant (Lebanon, Syria and Jordan) was called Everyday Enchantment. A later series was called the Magic of Morocco. 

Her work has been exhibited throughout the Arab world, UK, Europe and the US.

Select list of artworks 

 Calligraphy, 2005 
 The Dreamer,  [From the Mysteries of Egypt series], 2005 
 Man on Camel [From the Arab World Unveiled Series]. c. 2005
 Temple of Horus, [From the Arab World Unveiled Series]. c. 2005
 The Magic of Morocco date unknown
 Everyday Enchantment in the Levant, date unknown

Exhibitions 
Ayla's principal exhibitions include:
2004-2006: Arab World Unveiled, The San Anselmo Inn and Gallery, San Anselmo, CA
2005: Arab World Unveiled, La Kasbah, San Francisco, CA
2005: Arab World Unveiled, Lehrer Gallery, Larkspur, CA
2005: Arab World Unveiled, Mendocino Gallery, Mendocino, CA
2006: Arab World Unveiled, California Institute of Integral Studies, San Francisco, CA
2006: Arab World Unveiled, San Francisco Arab Cultural Center, San Francisco, CA
2006-2007: Le Tire Bouchon Gallery, Virginia, US
2006: Savannah Studio, London
2006: Kufa Gallery, London
2006: Aya Gallery, London
2007: Land of Enchantment, Arab Cultural Center of Silicon Valley, Saratoga, CA
2007:  Babylonian Women: Four Californian Artiswts with Roots in Iraq, Pomegranate Gallery, Soho, New York, 6–27 September 2007
2007: Cab Calloway School of the Arts, Wilmington, DE
2008: Iraqi American Bridge of Hope Exhibition, Wilmington, DE
2008: Essene Gallery, Sausalito, CA

See also
 Hurufiyya movement
 Iraqi art
 Islamic art
 List of Iraqi artists
 List of Iraqi women artists

References

External links

1957 births
American women painters
American women photographers
Artists from Baghdad
Iraqi calligraphers
Iraqi emigrants to the United States
Iraqi photographers
Iraqi women photographers
Iraqi women painters
Iraqi contemporary artists
Iraqi painters
Living people
University of Paris alumni
Iraqi expatriates in France
Iraqi expatriates in Saudi Arabia
Iraqi expatriates in Lebanon
Iraqi expatriates in the United Kingdom
Iraqi expatriates in Switzerland
21st-century American women